HMS Enterprise was one of two  light cruisers built for the Royal Navy. She was built by John Brown & Company, with the keel being laid down on 28 June 1918. She was launched on 23 December 1919, and commissioned on 7 April 1926. She was the 14th ship to serve with the Royal Navy to carry the name Enterprise, a name which is still used in the Royal Navy today.

Enterprise was completed with a prototype twin 6" turret in place of the original design two forward single mounts; and with the trials proving successful it was retained for the rest of her service career. The turret installation occupied less space than the superimposed 'A' and 'B' guns of Emerald, therefore the bridge was placed further forward. The bridge was of a new design, being a single block topped by a director tower, rather than the traditional platforms built around the foremast and wheelhouse topped with a spotting top. This design of bridge would appear in the s.

Service history

Pre-war

After several months in home waters, Enterprise served with the 4th Cruiser Squadron in the East Indies her first commission ending in December 1928. Her first commission was remarkable mostly for its culmination and the events that took place between 19 September and 10 December 1928 which are outlined under the history of the Enterprise Cup, a rugby union trophy that is still contested to this day in Kenya. Enterprise undertook several subsequent commissions on the East Indies Station, until she returned home and was reduced to care and maintenance on 4 July 1934, followed by a major refit. She returned to the East Indies in January 1936.

On the afternoon of 4 May 1936, Enterprise departed Djibouti in French Somaliland carrying the Emperor of Ethiopia, Haile Selassie – who had fled there as Italy completed its conquest of Ethiopia in the Second Italo-Ethiopian War – and transported him to Haifa in the British Mandate of Palestine, beginning his five-year period in exile in England at Fairfield House, Bath before he returned to Ethiopia in 1941.

The cruiser  relieved Enterprise on the East Indies Station at the end of 1937, and Enterprise came home. In February 1938, she was tasked with transporting Princess Alice, Countess of Athlone and her husband The Earl of Athlone to Saudi Arabia - the first visit by a member of the British Royal Family. Later that year, she was employed to take crews to the China Station, returning home to pay off on 30 September 1938, when she was reduced to the Reserve Fleet.

Second World War

Initial stages
At the start of the Second World War in September 1939, Enterprise was recommissioned and joined Atlantic patrols with the 4th Cruiser Squadron. She later joined the North America and West Indies Squadron. Enterprise was employed on Atlantic escort duties with the Halifax Escort Force in 1939–1940. In October 1939, she oversaw the transfer of £10 million (£ in today's currency) in gold bullion to Canada during Operation Fish.

In April 1940, she was transferred to the Home Fleet for the Norwegian Campaign. On 25 May, she left Harstad with a third of the Norwegian National Treasury bound for Britain. She sailed first to Scapa Flow, surviving two German air attacks on the way, then proceeded to Greenock, where the gold was taken ashore.

After some repairs, Enterprise joined the newly formed Force H in June 1940 and set sail for the Mediterranean Sea where, in July, she participated in negotiations with the French Navy regarding the future of the French fleet in the war. Following the unsatisfactory outcome of the negotiations, she participated in Operation Catapult at Mers-El-Kébir. She also participated in the delivery of aircraft to Malta in late July.

Outside home waters
Force H was then re-organised and Enterprise was sent to Cape Town after which she became the flagship for operations in South America, primarily involved in trade defence and interception duties.

In early 1941, she was redeployed to the Indian Ocean where, accompanied by a sizeable fleet of Royal Navy and Royal Australian Navy ships led by the aircraft carrier , she participated in a search for the German cruiser . After the search was abandoned, Enterprise took up convoy escort duty before being sent to Basra after a pro-German revolt by Rashid Ali al-Gaylani started the Anglo-Iraqi War. The war was won by the end of May, after which Enterprise was released back into convoy escort duty in the Indian Ocean.

In November, she was under refit and repair in Colombo, which was finished just in time for the start of the War with Japan in December 1941. She escorted troop ships to Singapore and Rangoon, Burma, and then joined the Eastern Fleet under Admiral Sir James Somerville, taking part in protection of trade for the next year. The Easter Sunday Raid was part of the larger Japanese Indian Ocean raid, which threatened British Ceylon. Enterprise participated in yet another fruitless search for enemy ships during this period, when it was believed the Japanese were preparing to strike and possibly invade the Indian Ocean island.

Home waters
On 25 December 1942, she returned to Clyde for extensive refit and modernisation works, which were completed only in October 1943. Trials and tests continued throughout November.

On 28 December, she engaged a force of 11 German destroyers and torpedo boats, the tardy escort for their blockade runner Alsterufer (which had been sunk the previous day by air attack). Four other German ships were damaged in the engagement.

From 3–29 February 1944, Enterprise was docked at Devonport for refit, and from 27–31 March she was fitted for missile jamming gear at Devonport.

The invasion of Normandy
She was in sub-group Assault Force "U" (for Utah Beach), of which she was the lead ship.

When the Normandy Landings started on 6 June 1944, Bombardment Force "A" bombarded St. Martin de Varreville. Enterprise engaged the coastal defences of Cherbourg; in the ensuing action, her Captain and her Commander were both wounded, and the ship was brought back to Portland by the First Lieutenant, Lieutenant Commander Brown. Twenty days later, she was also involved in the bombardment of Querqueville, silencing the German guns there. German shore batteries opened fire, but caused no significant damage to Enterprise. During the D-day operations, Enterprise fired about 9,000 6-inch shells and required two overnight gun changes at Portsmouth.

In July, she was deployed off the French coast in support of British operations, and on 17 July, she provided naval gunfire for two days in support for British attacks near Caen with the cruiser  and the monitor . In September, she was deployed in a similar capacity off the Dutch coast in support of the Second Army; however, she was not required to support the troops.

In October, after a contemplated transfer to the Royal Canadian Navy was not implemented, Enterprise was taken out of active service and placed in reserve at Rosyth.

Post-war
Starting in May 1945, Enterprise helped return British troops from Asia and Africa. On 13 January 1946, she returned to the United Kingdom for the final time. She was handed over to BISCO for scrapping on 11 April, arriving at J Cashmore in Newport, Wales, on 21 April for breaking-up.

Armament refits

Throughout her service, Enterprise was refitted with a slightly differing array of weaponry. Below is a table of the new armament after her first refit:

Battle honours
For her service in the Second World War, Enterprise was awarded four battle honours:
Atlantic (1939–40)
Norway (1940)
Biscay (1943)
Normandy (1944)

In addition, the ship inherited a battle honour from the fourth-rate ship of the line , which fought against Bourbon Spain in the Seven Years' War:
Havana (1762)

References

Notes

Bibliography

External links

HMS Enterprise at Uboat.net
NAVAL-HISTORY.NET
A History of Ships Named Enterprise

 

Ships built on the River Clyde
Emerald-class cruisers
World War II cruisers of the United Kingdom
1919 ships